The 35th Scripps National Spelling Bee was held in Washington, District of Columbia on June 6–7, 1962, sponsored by the E.W. Scripps Company.

Nettie Crawford (age 13) of Roswell, New Mexico and Mike Day (age 14) of Hardin, Illinois were announced as co-champions (the third tie in the bee's history) after both misspelled esquamulose, following an hour of head-to-head competition as the final contestants. The next tie-ending did not occur for over 50 years, in the 2014 bee. Third place was captured by Barbara Brugnaux, 14, of Ohio, who was eliminated in the 15th round after misspelling xylophagous.

There were 70 contestants this year, 48 girls and 21 boys. 718 words were used.

References

Scripps National Spelling Bee competitions
1962 in Washington, D.C.
1962 in education
June 1962 events in the United States